Algonquin Power & Utilities Corp. is a Canadian renewable energy and regulated utility conglomerate with assets across North America. Algonquin actively invests in hydroelectric, wind and solar power facilities, and utility businesses (water, natural gas, electricity), through its three operating subsidiaries: Bermuda Electric Light Company, Liberty Power and Liberty Utilities.

Public listing
Algonquin Power Income Fund was established in September 1997 and first listed its trust units on the Toronto Stock Exchange on December 23, 1997. Having raised nearly $75 M, Algonquin used $27.5 M to purchase 14 hydroelectric generation facilities located in Ontario, Québec, New York and New Hampshire.

Algonquin Power & Utilities Corp. was added to the TSX 60 Index on June 22, 2020.

Incorporation
In response to the Government of Canada's decision to end the preferential tax treatment of income trusts, Algonquin Power Income Fund was converted to a corporation in October 2009. Unit-holders exchanged their trust units on a one-for-one basis for shares in the new corporate entity, Algonquin Power & Utilities.

Liberty Utilities
Liberty Utilities operates in the following locations:
Arizona (water)
acquired Boulders Carefree Sewer Company in Carefree in 2001.
acquired Gold Canyon Sewer Company in Gold Canyon in 2001
acquired Bella Vista Water in Sierra Vista in 2002.
acquired Litchfield Park Service Company in Avondale from Pinnacle West Capital in 2003
acquired Rio Rico Utilities in Rio Rico in 2005
acquired seven water companies in Whetstone and Hereford from the John McLain bankruptcy estate in 2007.
acquired Entrada Del Oro Sewer Company, near Gold Canyon, in 2008.
Arkansas (water)
Acquired the Arkansas operations of United Water in 2012.
Acquired natural gas, water and electric distribution operations of Empire District Electric Company in 2017.
California (electricity, water)
Acquired NV Energy's California operations, serving the Lake Tahoe Basin, with Emera in 2009; bought out Emera's stake in 2011.
Acquired Park Water and Apple Valley Ranchos Water, serving Southern California, in 2016 from The Carlyle Group.
Acquired Mesa-Crest Water Co., serving La Cañada Flintridge, in 2019.
Georgia (gas)
Acquired the natural gas operation of Atmos Energy in Columbus and Gainesville in 2013
Illinois (gas, water)
Acquired the water operations of Silverleaf Resorts in 2005.
Acquired the natural gas operations of Atmos Energy in Illinois in 2012.
Iowa (gas)
Acquired the natural gas operations of Atmos Energy in Iowa in 2012.
Kansas
Acquired natural gas, water and electric distribution operations of Empire District Electric Company in 2017.
Massachusetts (gas)
acquired New England Gas Company in Fall River and North Attleborough from Laclede Group in 2013.
Missouri (gas, water, electric)
Acquired the water operations of Silverleaf Resorts in 2005.
Acquired Noel Water and KMB Utilities in 2011.
Acquired the natural gas operations of Atmos Energy in Missouri in 2012.
Acquired electric, natural gas and water operations of Empire District Electric Company in 2017.
New Hampshire (gas, electricity)
Acquired Granite State Electric and EnergyNorth Natural Gas from National Grid in 2012.
New York
Announced acquisition of New York American Water from American Water Works in 2019.
Acquired St. Lawrence Gas from Enbridge in 2019.
Oklahoma
Acquired electric, natural gas, and water operations of Empire District Electric Company in 2017.
Texas (water)
Acquired the water operations of Silverleaf Resorts in 2005.

Kentucky Power acquisition
On October 26, 2021 Liberty Utilities agreed to acquire the Kentucky operations of American Electric Power in a transaction valued at $2.8 billion (US). The purchase is expected to close in the second quarter of 2022, pending regulatory approval.

References

External links
 www.algonquinpower.com Website
 http://www.libertyutilities.com/

Electric power companies of Canada
Companies based in Oakville, Ontario
Energy companies established in 1997
Renewable resource companies established in 1997
Companies listed on the Toronto Stock Exchange
Canadian companies established in 1997
1997 establishments in Ontario